Jaren is the administrative centre of Gran Municipality in Innlandet county, Norway.

Jaren and its neighboring village of Brandbu have grown together through conurbation and Statistics Norway has considered them as one, single urban settlement for many years.

The Norwegian National Road 4 and the Gjøvikbanen railway line both run through the village, with the train stopping at Jaren Station. Moen Church lies in the northern part of Jaren.

Jaren is the municipality's industrial center. The cornerstone company Hapro produces industrial electronics. Jaren also has an aluminum goods factory, a quarry, and a grain silo. The Hadeland energy plant is located at Jaren. The Hadeland Folkemuseum has a site located just west of Jaren. The museum includes the Old Tingelstad Church which was built in Romanesque style during the Middle Ages, and it has a well-preserved Renaissance interior.

References

Gran, Norway
Villages in Innlandet